Sergei Aleksandrovich Kornilenko (born 14 June 1983) is a Belarusian professional football coach and a former player who played as a striker. He works as a sporting director of Krylia Sovetov Samara. In Belarus, both Belarusian and Russian languages are official. Thus his name, usually transliterated as Sergei Kornilenko, can be alternatively spelled as Syarhey Karnilenka.

Career
Vitebsk-born Kornilenko began his career in his native Belarus as a trainee with FC Dinamo Minsk before joining his hometown club. After an unsuccessful half a season with Vitebsk he returned to Minsk, where he spent three seasons before moving to Ukraine with Dynamo Kyiv and Dnipro Dnipropetrovsk.

In 2008, he moved to the Russian Premier League with FC Tom Tomsk, with whom he enjoyed a successful first season. On 19 July 2009 FC Zenit signed the striker until December 2013. The Russian club had needed a new striker after a serious injury to Danny and after transfer listing Fatih Tekke. On 9 March 2010 Kornilenko was loaned back to Tom Tomsk for the remainder of the 2009–10 season. He returned to Zenit in the summer of 2010 but was loaned out again, this time to Rubin Kazan, until January 2011. On 31 January 2011, Kornilenko signed on loan for English Premier League club Blackpool, turning down a move to Standard Liège in the process. In June 2011, he signed a contract with Russian Premier League club Krylia Sovetov Samara.

He announced his retirement on 10 July 2019. On 17 February 2021, Krylia Sovetov announced that he will be registered as a club player again to play a farewell game at the home field. He scored the last goal of a 6–0 victory over FC Krasnodar-2 on 8 May 2021, one minute after appearing as a substitute in the 83rd minute. Krylia Sovetov had secured their return to the Russian Premier League two games prior to that one.

International career

Kornilenko is a regular member of the Belarus national football team, earning his first cap in 2004. On 8 September 2015, Kornilenko captained his side in the absence of suspended Alyaksandr Martynovich in the 2:0 win over Luxembourg in a Euro 2016 qualifier.

In the summer of 2012 he was selected as one of the over aged players to represent Belarus at the 2012 Summer Olympics in London to participate in the Men's football tournament.

International goals

Personal life

Kornilenko is married and has a daughter.

Honours
Dinamo Minsk
 Belarusian Cup winner: 2002–03
 Belarusian Premier League top scorer: 2003

Dynamo Kyiv
 Ukrainian Premier League champion: 2003–04
 Ukrainian Super Cup winner: 2004

Zenit St. Petersburg
Russian Cup: 2009–10

Krylia Sovetov
Russian Football National League winner: 2014–15, 2020-21

References

External links

Profile at the official FC Zenit St. Petersburg website
 
 
 English Premier League profile

1983 births
Living people
Sportspeople from Vitebsk
Belarusian footballers
Belarusian expatriate footballers
Belarus youth international footballers
Belarus under-21 international footballers
Belarus international footballers
FC Vitebsk players
Belarusian Premier League players
FC Dnipro players
FC Dinamo Minsk players
FC Dynamo Kyiv players
FC Tom Tomsk players
FC Zenit Saint Petersburg players
Expatriate footballers in Russia
Expatriate footballers in Ukraine
Russian Premier League players
Ukrainian Premier League players
Premier League players
Belarusian expatriate sportspeople in Ukraine
Belarusian expatriate sportspeople in Russia
Belarusian expatriate sportspeople in England
FC Rubin Kazan players
Blackpool F.C. players
Expatriate footballers in England
PFC Krylia Sovetov Samara players
Olympic footballers of Belarus
Footballers at the 2012 Summer Olympics
Belarusian people of Ukrainian descent
FC Lokomotiv Vitebsk (defunct) players
FC Dinamo-Juni Minsk players
Association football forwards